The Flower That Shattered the Stone is the 23rd studio album by American singer-songwriter John Denver. It was released in September 1990.

This release consists of nine tracks taken from Denver's 21st studio album, Stonehaven Sunrise (an Australian only release in 1989); two tracks taken from his 22nd studio album, Earth Songs; and a song from a Japan-only single, "The Flower That Shattered The Stone (reprise)". Some tracks were slightly remixed for this album.

Track listing

Side one
 "The Flower That Shattered the Stone" (John Jarvis, Joe Henry)
 "Thanks to You" (Denver, Johnny Christopher, Sam Hogin, Conrad Reeder)
 "Postcard from Paris" (Denver, Jimmy Webb)
 "High, Wide & Handsome" (Chuck Pyle)
 "Eagles and Horses" (Denver, Joe Henry)
 "A Little Further North" (Denver, Graeme Connors)

Alex Carey

Side two
 "Raven’s Child" (Denver, Joe Henry)
 "Ancient Rhymes" (Denver, Bob Samples)
 "The Gift You Are" (Denver)
 "I Watch You Sleeping" (Mike Batt)
 "Stonehaven Sunset" (Denver)
 "The Flower That Shattered the Stone (Reprise)" (duet with Kosetsu Minami) (John Jarvis, Joe Henry)

Stonehaven Sunrise track listing
 "High, Wide & Handsome" (Chuck Pyle)
 "Thanks To You" (Denver, Johnny Christopher, Sam Hogin, Conrad Reeder)
 "You're Still The One For Me" (Sung By Cassandra Delaney-Denver)
 "And So It Goes" (with the Nitty Gritty Dirt Band) (Released in the US on the NGDB album Will the Circle Be Unbroken: Volume Two)
 "Wish You Were Here (Postcard Du Paris)" (Denver, Jimmy Webb)
 "A Little Further North" (Denver, Graeme Connors)
 "Ancient Rhymes" (Denver, Bob Samples)
 "The Gift You Are" (Denver)
 "I Watch You Sleeping" (Mike Batt)
 "Eagles and Horses (I'm Flying Again)" (Denver, Joe Henry)
 "Stonehaven Sunset" (Denver)

References

1990 albums
John Denver albums
Albums produced by Roger Nichols (recording engineer)